Drakensbergena is a genus of leafhoppers in the tribe Drakensbergenini of the subfamily Deltocephalinae. There are currently 18 described species all found in the grasslands and fynbos of South Africa and Lesotho.

Species 
There are currently 18 described species in Drakensbergena:

References 

Endemic fauna of South Africa
Deltocephalinae
Hemiptera tribes